Joshua Alex Culwell (born May 17, 1994) is an American soccer player who currently plays for Los Angeles Force in the National Independent Soccer Association.

Career 
Culwell played college soccer at Fresno City College in 2012 and 2013.

In 2017 and 2018, Culwell appeared in the USL PDL for Fresno Fuego and Fresno FC U23 respectively.

In 2019, Culwell played with NPSL side FC Golden State, helping them to top the Southwest Conference. He later signed with NISA side Los Angeles Force ahead of their inaugural season, started every game and captained every game

In 2020, Culwell moved to USL Championship side Las Vegas Lights. He made his debut for the club on September 26, 2020, starting in a 2–2 draw with LA Galaxy II.

References

External links 
 
 

1994 births
Living people
American soccer players
Association football midfielders
Fresno Fuego players
Los Angeles Force players
Las Vegas Lights FC players
Soccer players from California
USL Championship players
USL League Two players
National Premier Soccer League players
National Independent Soccer Association players